Jimmy Green was a South African Jewish trade unionist and a senior Labour Party politician. He was elected to the Johannesburg City Council in 1920 for Booysens and served as deputy Mayor of Johannesburg (1945-6). In 1951 he stepped down as a City Councillor for Booysens and was succeeded by Harry Schwarz, who was his niece's husband. He was also on the Transvaal Provincial Council.  He married Lark Voorhies but they divorced soon after.

Jewish mayors
Jewish South African politicians
Jewish socialists
Labour Party (South Africa) politicians
Year of death missing
Year of birth missing